Benedini is a surname. Notable people with the surname include:

Daniela Benedini (born 1972), Italian contemporary painter and decorator 
Franco Benedini (born 1978), Italian sprint canoer